Crete and Cyrenaica was a senatorial province of the Roman Republic and later the Roman Empire, established in 67 BC, which included the island of Crete and the region of Cyrenaica in modern-day Libya. These areas were settled by Greek colonists from the eighth to sixth centuries BC. After Alexander the Great's death, his short-lived empire was partitioned between his generals during the Wars of the Diadochi. Cyrenaica ended up under Egyptian rule, except for Crete, which remained independent.

Apion's will and Roman rule of Cyrenaica
Ptolemy Apion, the last king of the Hellenistic Kingdom of Cyrenaica left his kingdom to the Roman Republic when he died childless in 96 BC.  Rome readily accepted this inheritance from Ptolemy Apion but preferred to leave the administration to local rulers, rather than enforcing direct control. However, by the 70s BC, civil uprisings by Jewish settlers began to destabilise the province and the Senate was forced to take action. In 74 BC, they sent a low level official, the quaestor Cornelius Lentulus Marcellinus, to officially annex Cyrenaica as a Roman province and restore order. That the Senate sent such a low-ranking official indicates the political difficulty the Republic had in governing its growing empire, as well as indicating the ease with which Cyrenaica was willing to submit to Roman governance and the stability it brought.

Roman conquest of Crete
Marcus Antonius Creticus attacked Crete in 71 BC and was repelled. Then in 69 BC, Rome commissioned Quintus Caecilius Metellus and, following a ferocious three-year campaign, Crete was conquered for Rome in 66 BC, Metellus earning the agnomen "Creticus" as an honour for his conquest and subjugation of Crete.

Province
In 67 BC, Crete and Cyrenaica were combined into a single province with its capital at Gortyn in Crete. In 117 AD, a Jewish revolt erupted in Cyrenaica, resulting in the death of two hundred and twenty thousand people. In 298 AD, Diocletian, because of geographic inconvenience, separated the province of Crete from Cyrenaica, which in turn was divided between Libya Superior or Libya Pentapolis, with Cyrene as its capital, and Libya Inferior or Libya Sicca, with Paraetonium as its capital.

List of Roman governors
 C. Clodius Vestalis (between 30 BC and AD 14)
 M. Titius (between 30 BC and AD 14)
 Pomponius Secundus (between AD 37 and 54)
 Fabius (before 13 BC)
 P. Sextius Scaeva (7/6 BC)
 Q. Lucanius Proculus (after 13 BC)
 L. Plotius Vicinas (between 2 BC and AD 7)
 (Lollius) Palikanus (between 30 BC and AD 14)
 Marcus Nonius Balbus (between 30 BC and AD 14)
 Scato (between 30 BC and AD 14)
 Gaius Rubellius Blandus (between 30 BC and AD 14)
 Caesius Cordus (c. AD 12)
 P. Octavius (between AD 14 and 29)
 Occius Flamma (between AD 14 and 37)
 Cornelius Lupus (between AD 14 and 37)
 P. Viriasius Naso 
 Celer 
 Augurinus (between AD 37 and 41)
 Q. Cassius Gratus (before 53)
 Caesernius Veiento (46/47?)
 Publius Pomponius Secundus (between 37 and 54)
 Cestius Proculus (before 56)
 Pedius Blaesus (before 59)
 Bruttidius Sabinus (first half 1st century)
 Lucius Turpilius Dexter (64/65)
 Titus Atilius Rufus (67)
 Aulus Minicius Rufus (71/72)
 Catullus (72/73)
 Gaius Arinius Modestus (73-75)
 Silo
 Aulus Julius Quadratus (84/85)
 Gaius Pomponius Gallus Didius Rufus (88/89)
 Gaius Memmius [...] (98/99)
 Lucius Elufrius Severus (99/100)
 Lucius Aemilius Honoratus (between 97 and 118)
 Titus Vibius Varus (between 97 and 118)
 Salvius Carus (134/135)
 Quintus Caecilius Marcellus Dentilianus (c. 140)
 Quintus Julius Potitus (between 138 and 161)
 Gaius Claudius Titianus Demostratus (161/162)
 Pomponius Naevianus (between 165 and 169)
 Veturius Paccianus (before 168)
 Lucius Saevinius Proculus (173/174)
 Quintus Caecilius Rufinus (between 160 and 180)
 Quintus Servilius Pudens (164/165)
 Lucius Clodius Tineius Pupienus Bassus (250)

Further reading
Jane Francis and Anna Kouremenos (eds.) 2016. Roman Crete: New Perspectives. Oxford: Oxbow
 Anna Kouremenos 2018. "In the Heart of the Wine-Dark Sea: Cretan Insularity and Identity in the Roman Period". In A. Kouremenos (ed.) Insularity and Identity in the Roman Mediterranean. Oxford: Oxbow.

References

 
Roman Crete
Roman Libya
Provinces of the Roman Empire
Roman provinces in Africa
Roman provinces in Europe
Ancient Cyrenaica
States and territories established in the 1st century BC
20 BC establishments
States and territories disestablished in the 3rd century
20s BC establishments in the Roman Empire
290s disestablishments in the Roman Empire
1st-century BC establishments
3rd-century disestablishments
20s BC establishments
Libya in the Roman era